The Rizzanese is a coastal river in the southwest of department of Corse-du-Sud, Corsica, France. 
It is dammed near Sorbollano to form the Rizzanese Reservoir, which stores water for irrigation and supplies the largest hydroelectric power plant in Corsica, with installed capacity of 55 MW.
It flows into the Mediterranean Sea near the town of Propriano.

Course

It crosses the communes of Arbellara, Cargiaca, Levie, Loreto-di-Tallano, Olmiccia, Propriano, Quenza, Sartène, Serra-di-Scopamène, Sorbollano, San-Gavino-di-Carbini, Sainte-Lucie-de-Tallano, Viggianello, Zonza and Zoza.

The Rizzanese rises in the commune of Zonza south of the  Castellucciu and north of the  Monte Calva.
It flows northwest and then west past the village of Zonza, then flows west, southwest past Zoza and west again to enter the sea in the Golfe du Valinco just north of the Propriano Airport.

Dam

The river is dammed by the Barrage du Rizzanese to the south of the village of Sorbollano.
The dam is owned by Électricité de France (EDF) and impounds  of water.
A tunnel carries water from the dam to the hydroelectric power station at Sainte Lucie de Tallano in the Levo plain.
With installed capacity of 55 MW the power plant delivers almost 40% of the island's hydroelectricity.

Construction began in mid-2008.
The tunnel to carry water from the dam to the power station was completed on 15 October 2010.
On 21 May 2012 the dam was handed over to EDF to start filling the dam.
Impoundment of the Rizzanese reservoir began on 23 May 2012.
The first of two turbines was connected to the Corsican electricity network on 21 February 2013.
Full commissioning was expected in mid-September 2013.

Hydrology

Measurements of the river flow were taken near its mouth at the Pont de Rena Bianca station in Propriano between 2018 and 2021.

Measurements of the river flow were taken at the Zoza station from 1966 to 2021.
The maximum daily flow was  recorded on 20 December 2016.

Tributaries

The  Chiuvone river and the  Fiumicicoli river are tributaries. 
The following streams (ruisseaux) are also tributaries of the Rizzanese (ordered by length) and sub-tributaries:

 Saint-Antoine: 
 Lavu Niellu et de Bavonu: 
 Truva: 
 Vicciulega: 
 Giavinaccio: 
 Altagnoli: 
 Muratellu: 
 Caracutu: 
 Donicelli: 
 Ceca la Volpe: 
 Tassu: 
 Cavadili: 
 Saparellu: 
 Acqua Dolce: 
 Paljacciu: 
 Aja Murata: 
 Scalella: 
 Aja Martinu: 
 Titinella: 
 Codi: 
 San Petru: 
 Coscione: 
 Vinajolo: 
 Biturgia: 
 Chiarasgiola: 
 Cota: 
 Muzzasca: 
 Pascialella: 
 Funtana Grigia: 
 Mela Longa: 
 Jallicu: 
 Campo Maggiore: 
 Culiccia: 
 Verju: 
 Erbajo: 
 Vignalella: 
 Minza: 
 Argazavu: 
 Canale: 
 Neu: 
 Capula: 
 Boda: 
 Bugnaju: 
 Jumenta: 
 Turicciu: 
 Figalata: 
 Pieve: 
 Furvicilla: 
 Vetricelli: 
 Giovangara: 
 Aravena: 
 Furciolu: 
 Sadise: 
 Bufaneru: 
 la Giaga: 
 Piubettu: 
 Agnone:

Notes

Sources

Rivers of Corse-du-Sud
Rivers of France
Coastal basins of the Mediterranean Sea in Corsica